Balázs Kiss (born 27 January 1983) is a Hungarian Greco-Roman wrestler. He won the bronze medal in the 96 kg division at the 2013 World Wrestling Championships.

Major results

References

External links
 
 
 
 

1983 births
Living people
Hungarian male sport wrestlers
World Wrestling Championships medalists
Wrestlers at the 2016 Summer Olympics
Olympic wrestlers of Hungary
Wrestlers at the 2019 European Games
European Games competitors for Hungary